Wally Matera (born 9 September 1963) is a former Australian rules footballer. He played with the West Coast Eagles and Fitzroy in the AFL and for South Fremantle in the WAFL. 

Matera arrived in South Fremantle from Wagin Federals, debuting in 1982 at the age of eighteen. Three years later he won their best and fairest and after another solid season he found himself in West Coast's squad for their debut season.  He top scored for the Eagles in their first league game, kicking 4 goals. After a couple of seasons he moved to Victoria where he played with Fitzroy until the end of 1990. 

After leaving the AFL he stayed in Victoria, representing Prahran briefly.  He then returned to Western Australia, where he won the South Fremantle best and fairest twice more and was appointed captain in 1993 after being vice-captain in 1992.

His brothers, Peter and Phillip Matera both followed in his footsteps and represented West Coast. His sons Brandon and Bailey also play Australian rules football. Both Brandon and Bailey were members of Subiaco's 2021 WAFL premiership winning team.

References

External links

1963 births
Living people
South Fremantle Football Club players
West Coast Eagles players
Fitzroy Football Club players
Prahran Football Club players
Indigenous Australian players of Australian rules football
Australian rules footballers from Western Australia
People from Wagin, Western Australia
Australian people of Italian descent